The 2014 Rushmoor Borough Council election took place on 22 May 2014 to elect members of Rushmoor Borough Council in England. This was on the same day as other local elections and the elections for the European Parliament. 

Labour gained one seat from the Conservatives, while UKIP regained a seat whose previous incumbent had defected to Labour.

After the election, the composition of the Council was:

 Conservative - 24
 Labour - 12
 UKIP - 3

Results

Ward results

Aldershot Park

Cherrywood

Cove & Southwood

Empress

Fernhill

Knellwood

Manor Park

North Town

Rowhill

St John's

St Mark's

Wellington

West Heath

References

2014 English local elections
2014
2010s in Hampshire